The Nashik inscription of Ushavadata is an inscription made in the Nashik Caves by Ushavadata, a son-in-law of the Western Satraps ruler Nahapana, in the years circa 120 CE. It is the earliest known instance of the usage of Sanskrit, although a rather hybrid form, in western India. It also documents the Indian tradition of dana (charity) to Brahmins, Buddhists and of building infrastructure to serve pilgrims and the general public by the 2nd-century CE.

Characteristics
The inscription is classified as "Inscription No.10" of the Nasik Caves. It is located on the front porch of Cave No.10, also called the "Nahapana Vihara". It is several meters in length.

Usage of hybrid Sanskrit
Altogether, the caves contains six inscriptions of the family of Nahapana, but the Ushavadata inscription is particularly important in that it is the earliest known instance of the usage of Sanskrit, although a rather hybrid form, in western India. Most of the other inscriptions made by the Western Satraps were in Prakrit, using the Brahmi script.

In what has been described as "the great linguistical paradox of India", Sanskrit inscriptions first appeared much later than Prakrit inscriptions, although Prakrit is considered as a descendant of the Sanskrit language. This is because Prakrit, in its multiple variants, had been favoured since the time of the influential Edicts of Ashoka (circa 250 BCE). Besides a few examples from the 1st century BCE, most of the early Sanskrit inscriptions date to the time of the Indo-Scythian rulers, either the Northern Satraps around Mathura for the earliest ones, or, slightly later, the closely related Western Satraps in western and central India. It is thought that these Indo-Scythian rulers became promoters of Sanskrit as a way to show their attachment to Indian culture: according to Salomon "their motivation in promoting Sanskrit was presumably a desire to establish themselves as legitimate Indian or at least Indianized rulers and to curry the favor of the educated Brahmanical elite".

In western India, the first known inscription in Sanskrit appears to have been made by Ushavadata, son-in-law of the Western Satrap ruler Nahapana, at the front of Cave n°10 in the Nasik Caves. The inscription dates to the early 2nd century CE, and has hybrid features. It was followed by the Junagadh rock inscription, inscribed by Rudradaman I circa 150 CE, is "the first long inscription recorded entirely in more or less standard Sanskrit". Sanskrit inscriptions by the Western Satraps are not found for about two hundred years after the Rudradaman reign, but it is important because its style is the prototype of the eulogy-style Sanskrit inscriptions found in the Gupta Empire era. These inscriptions are all in the Brahmi script.

Dedication of the cave to Buddhists
 
The inscription reveals that Kshatrapa Nahapana’s son-in-law and Dinika’s son- Ushavadata built cave No.10 for Buddhist monks and donated 3000 gold coins for this cave as well as for the food and clothing of the monks. 

The dedication of the cave to the Buddhist Samgha is mentioned in another inscription in the same cave, inscription No.12:

Full text of the inscription

Characteristics of Sanskrit in the inscription
The first three lines of the inscription consist in an eulogy of Ushavadata, and are written in fairly standard Sanskrit, except for a few hybrid features, including several sandhi hiatuses and hybrid morphology (e.g. bhojāpayitrā). The rest of the inscription records the actual donations, and is more hybrid. Ushavadatta is otherwise known for making inscriptions in Prakrit in the Karla Caves, which, especially for the eulogy portion, are largely similar in content.

According to Richard Salomon, Ushavadatta may have followed the example set by the Northern Satraps of Mathura, in using Sanskrit in some of his inscriptions. It would seem the usage of literary Sanskrit may have been a fashionable way of adding some formality to inscriptions which had traditionally been made in Prakrit.

References

Sources
 
 

2nd-century inscriptions
Buddhist caves in India
Caves of Maharashtra
Indian rock-cut architecture
Tourist attractions in Nashik district
Buddhist pilgrimage sites in India
Sanskrit inscriptions in India